Sedillo is a census-designated place  in Bernalillo County, New Mexico, United States. Its population was 802 as of the 2010 census. The community is located along Interstate 40.

Demographics

Education
The area is divided between Albuquerque Public Schools and Moriarty Municipal Schools.

References

Census-designated places in New Mexico
Census-designated places in Bernalillo County, New Mexico